Mazzocchi may refer to:

 Domenico Mazzocchi (1592–1665), Italian composer, brother of Virgilio
 Virgilio Mazzocchi (1597–1646), Italian composer, brother of Domenico
 Mazzocchi brothers, rival mafiosi of Ruggerio "Richie the Boot" Boiardo's
 A plant of the genus Corchorus
 Part of a chaperon (hood or headgear)

See also
 Marzocchi, an Italian manufacturer of suspension components for motorcycles and bicycles
 Andrea Mazzucchi (born 1966), Italian-American computer specialist and entrepreneur 

Italian-language surnames